Yeshivat Or Vishua is a hesder yeshiva located in the Neve Sha'anan neighborhood of Haifa. Its head is Rabbi Eliyahu Zini, who is also the former rabbi of the nearby Technion university.

Its name means "Yeshiva of Light and Redemption".

Its population includes many people who are or were associated with the Technion, as well as many French immigrants, and other people who live in Haifa and its suburbs.

External links
 Official home page

Or Vishua
Buildings and structures in Haifa
Educational institutions established in 2000
2000 establishments in Israel
Jews and Judaism in Haifa